Freshwater is a 2018 autobiographical fiction novel by Nigerian writer Akwaeke Emezi. Emezi's debut novel, it tells the story of Ada, a girl with multiple ogbanje dwelling inside her. A TV series based on the novel is under development by FX.

Plot

Freshwater tells the semi-autobiographical story of the protagonist, Ada, a Nigerian student in her final year of college who finds out that she has three spirits living in her subconscious. They eventually take control of her, threatening to ruin her life and sanity. 

Emezi explores their Igbo heritage's views on spirituality and gender roles alongside those of Western construction and invites their audience to think critically about this spirit/body binary.

Reception

The New Yorker called Freshwater "a startling début novel"; The Guardian called it "a remarkable debut"; and the LA Times called it "dazzling". Freshwater was longlisted for numerous significant awards. Freshwater was a New York Times Notable Book, was named a Best Book of the Year by the New Yorker and NPR. Emezi is also recognized as a 2018 National Book Foundation "5 Under 35" honoree.

In 2019, Freshwater was nominated for the Women's Prize for Fiction — the first time a non-binary transgender author has been nominated for the prize. Kate Williams, the chair of the judges, called it a "historic moment". Williams said that the panel did not know Emezi was non-binary when the book was chosen, but she said Emezi was happy to be nominated. Non-binary commentator Vic Parsons wrote that the nomination raised uncomfortable questions, asking: "would a non-binary author who was assigned male at birth have been longlisted? I highly doubt it." After the nomination, it was announced that the Women's Prize Trust was working on new guidelines for transgender, non-binary, and genderfluid authors.

Controversy 

After Emezi posted tweets regarding Nigerian author Chimamanda Ngozi Adichie's association with transphobic public figures, Adichie (who had previously helped publish Emezi's work in an online magazine) asked that all references to her name be removed from the "about the author" section of the book jacket on all future copies of Freshwater.

Awards 
2019 Nommo Award,won 
 2019 Otherwise Award, won
2019  Women's Prize for Fiction, nominated

Adaptation 
In May 2019, news announced that the novel was optioned by FX for a TV series adaptation. Emezi will write the screenplay and executive produce the series with Tamara P. Carter. FX Productions will produce it alongside Kevin Wandell and Lindsey Donahue.

References

2018 American novels
2018 fantasy novels
2018 LGBT-related literary works
American fantasy novels
African-American young adult novels
American young adult novels
Debut fantasy novels
2018 debut novels
Nigerian English-language novels
Nigerian fantasy novels
Nigerian LGBT novels
2010s LGBT novels
American LGBT novels
Novels by Akwaeke Emezi
2018 Nigerian novels
James Tiptree Jr. Award-winning works
Grove Press books